The Invisible Menace is a 1938 American mystery film directed by John Farrow and starring Boris Karloff. It was also known as Without Warning.

Plot
An army private (Craven) and his new bride (Wilson) are trying to honeymoon on an island occupied by the military and a murderer.

Cast
 Boris Karloff as Mr. Jevries, aka Dolman
 Marie Wilson as Sally Wilson Pratt
 Eddie Craven as Pvt. Eddie Pratt
 Regis Toomey as Lt. Matthews
 Henry Kolker as Col. George Hackett
 Cy Kendall as Col. Bob Rogers
 Charles Trowbridge as Dr. Brooks
 Eddie Acuff as Cpl. Sanger
 Frank Faylen as Al (private of the guard)
 Phyllis Barry as Mrs. Aline Dolman
 Harland Tucker as Ted Reilly
 William Haade as Pvt. Ferris
 John Ridgely as Pvt. Innes (scenes deleted)
 Jack Mower as Sgt. Peterson
 Anderson Lawler as Pvt. Abbott (as Anderson Lawlor)
 John Harron as Pvt. Murphy

Production
The film was based on a play Without Warning by Ralph Spencer Zink which had a short run on Broadway in May 1937. The New York Times called it a "competent detective play."

Warner Bros bought the film rights and assigned Boris Karloff to star and John Farrow to direct. Jane Wyman was originally meant to play the female lead.

Wyman was replaced by Marie Wilson. Filming started August 1937.

See also
 Boris Karloff filmography

References

Sources

External links

 
 
 
 

1938 films
American black-and-white films
American mystery films
Films directed by John Farrow
Films produced by Hal B. Wallis
Warner Bros. films
1938 mystery films
1930s English-language films
1930s American films
Films scored by Bernhard Kaun
Films about honeymoon